The Barber Snark is a two-seater kit-plane, designed and built in New Zealand by Bill Barber.  It first flew in late 1987. Only some five aircraft have been built.

Design and development
The Snark is a tricycle aircraft of composite construction.  Its glider-like cockpit accommodates a pilot and passenger in tandem, the passenger sitting behind and higher than the pilot. The centrally mounted shoulder-wing lies behind the pilot, who has unrestricted visibility. The  Suzuki engine is sited behind the cockpit, driving a pusher propeller.  Wing control surfaces on the third Snark were flaperons, while the fourth aircraft had conventional ailerons and flaps.  Above the propeller, and aft of the cockpit is a slender boom to the empennage comprising a T-tail with a high-mounted tailplane.

The Snark's tandem layout, its small frontal area, and its low wetted area mean that the aircraft has excellent performance, being able to cruise at over 110 knots despite having an engine output of only 80 bhp.

Reception

The Snark received positive reviews in the UK and NZ press.  Former RNZAF Squadron Leader and aviation journalist Tim Cripps wrote in Pilot magazine, "this is the most enjoyable of the many aircraft I have flown - and that includes the Hunter".  Similarly, David Laing, a former WWII pilot who built the fourth Snark, declared it to be "one of the nicest planes I've ever flown".

Specifications (Barber Snark)

References

External links 

Barber Snark
Background and images

Homebuilt aircraft
Shoulder-wing aircraft
Aircraft manufactured in New Zealand
Single-engined pusher aircraft
Aircraft first flown in 1987